Tasso Katselas (born 1927) is an architect in the United States known for his modernist concrete buildings especially in Pittsburgh, Pennsylvania. His work includes Pittsburgh International Airport, public housing, and mansions. His firm was known as Tasso Katselas Associates and became TKA when he semi-retired in 2005 while continuing to consult for the firm.

Katselas' parents immigrated to the United States from Greece. His work includes public housing and civic structures.

He grew up in East Pittsburgh and studied architecture at the Carnegie Institute of Technology (now Carnegie Mellon). He taught at Kansas State College and designed a chapel for the Fallingwater property after Frank Lloyd Wright recommended him to Liliane Kaufmann for the design of a chapel but she died and the project was never built. He opened his own architectural firm in Pittsburgh in 1955.

He designed a house for his family that was built in 1964.

Personal life
Katselas married Jane Banning in 1951. They have two daughters, Dana and Lisa. Lisa Katselas is a film producer and college professor.

Work
Manchester Bidwell Corporation
New terminal building, Pittsburgh International Airport
Carnegie Science Center
Pittsburgh Technical College
Community College of Allegheny County
Saint Vincent College monastery and college master plan after a major fire
Katselas house
Allegheny Commons East
Information Sciences Building, University of Pittsburgh School of Computing and Information, previously  the home of the former School of Information Science and originally the American Institutes for Research Building. Brutalist

References

1927 births
Living people
American architects
Architects from Pittsburgh
Kansas State University faculty
American people of Greek descent
Carnegie Mellon University alumni